French Carmel is a neighbourhood of Haifa (Israel), located on the western slopes of Mount Carmel. The population is predominantly Jewish.

Name
The name "French Carmel" was given to the area due to the fact that the Discalced Carmelites were only able to acquire an Ottoman building permit for the monastery they erected here in 1867-74 thanks to the intervention of the French consul, and after its destruction they rebuilt the Stella Maris Monastery in the current shape between 1827 and 1836 with constant support from the kings of France.

Notable institutions

References

Neighborhoods of Haifa